Mary Washington may refer to:
 Mary L. Washington (born 1962), Maryland legislator
 Mary Ball Washington (1708–1789), mother of U.S. President George Washington
 University of Mary Washington, Fredericksburg, Virginia, named after Mary Ball Washington
 Mary Helen Washington, American literary scholar
 Mary T. Washington (1906–2005), first African-American woman to be a certified public accountant in the United States
 Mary Burke Washington (1926–2014), American economist